Reginald Wilfred Trotman  (10 July 1906 – 1970) was an English footballer who played as an inside forward for Bristol Rovers and Rochdale. He was also in the reserve team of Sheffield Wednesday, and played non-league football for various other clubs.

References

Bristol Rovers F.C. players
Rochdale A.F.C. players
Sheffield Wednesday F.C. players
Kingswood A.F.C. players
Worksop Town F.C. players
Mansfield Town F.C. players
Dartford F.C. players
Bath City F.C. players
Roman Glass St George F.C. players
Trowbridge Town F.C. players
Footballers from Bristol
English footballers
1906 births
1970 deaths
Association footballers not categorized by position